Li Ying  (born ) is a retired  Chinese female volleyball player who played as a libero.

She was part of the China women's national volleyball team at the 2002 FIVB Volleyball Women's World Championship in Germany, and 2002 Asian Games.

Clubs
  Liaoning Huanyu (2002)
  Bayi (Army) Keming Surface Industry (2002 - 2009)

References

1979 births
Living people
Chinese women's volleyball players
Volleyball players from Dalian
Volleyball players at the 2002 Asian Games
Medalists at the 2002 Asian Games
Asian Games medalists in volleyball
Asian Games gold medalists for China
Liberos
21st-century Chinese women